Damien Raemy (born 6 April 1994) is a Grand Prix motorcycle racer from Switzerland. He currently races in the IDM Supersport 600 Championship aboard a Yamaha R6.

Career statistics

By season

Races by year

References

External links
 Profile on motogp.com
www.damien-raemy.com

1994 births
Swiss motorcycle racers
Living people
125cc World Championship riders
Sportspeople from the canton of Fribourg